Raj Narain College Hajipur, which has recently been accredited by the NAAC with high ‘B’ grade, is one of the premier constituent units of B.R.A. Bihar University, Muzaffarpur. It is the oldest institution of the higher education in the district of Vaishali.

Hajipur, the headquarters of the district of Vaishali, is situated near the confluence of rivers Gandak and Ganga. As a matter of fact, Vaishali in general and Hajipur in particular, is the confluence of many cultures and languages like Bajjika, Maithali, Bhojpuri and Magahi.

Raj Narain College, Hajipur was established on 1 August 1952. The chief donor Late Raj Narain Singh donated a considerable amount and took great interest in the development of this college throughout his life . Dr. Anugrah Narain Singh, the then Finance Minister of Bihar, laid the foundation of the college.

Infrastructure and facilities 
Land area: 6 acres (approximate )
Built up area: 5000 sq. metres
Play ground: 2 acres
Number of class rooms: 30
Number of laboratories: 15 
Number of tutorial rooms: 05
Number of seminar rooms: 01
Number of conference rooms: 01
Auditorium: 01
Computer centre: 01
Library: 01
Canteen: 01

Department and courses

Science
Physics
Chemistry
Mathematic

Arts
Hindi
 English
Urdu
Sanskrit
Economics
History
Philosophy
Political Science
Psychology

Vocational
 Department of Computer Application

Commerce
I.Com
B.Com
M.Com
BBA
MBA

Access 
Distance from nearest famous places of Hajipur to the college is as follows:
500 metres' distance from Chauhatta, Hajipur
850 metres' distance from Hajipur
1.4 km distance from Hajipur-Jadhua road 
2.6 km distance from Hajipur Court, Kachahari road, Gandhi chowk 
3.1 km distance from Ramashish chowk Bus stand
9.2 km distance from Mahatma Gandhi setu bridge
19 km distance from state capital Patna

Railway station distance 
3.2 km from Hajipur Junction
6.9 km from Sonpur railway station

References

Universities and colleges in Vaishali district
Universities and colleges in Bihar
Education in Hajipur
Educational institutions established in 1952
1952 establishments in Bihar